The Swedish Polytechnic was an institution of higher professional education (vocational university) in Vaasa, Finland. It offered bachelor's and master's degree programmes in Swedish in the fields of technology, health care, social welfare in Vaasa and within culture in Nykarleby and Jakobstad.

On August 1, 2008, the University merged with the Sydväst Polytechnic to form the Novia University of Applied Sciences.

Programmes
 Mechanical and Production Engineering
 Industrial Management and Engineering
 Electrical Engineering
 Information Technology
 Construction Engineering
 Land Surveying
 Environmental Engineering
 Laboratory Studies
 Health Care
 Radiography and Radiotherapy
 Medical Laboratory Studies
 Nursing
 Social Welfare
 Beauty Care
 Music
 Drama Studies
 Fine Arts
 Photography
 Film- and TV-production
 Design

References

Vaasa
Nursing schools in Finland
1997 establishments in Sweden
Educational institutions established in 1997